The 1962 UC Davis Aggies football team represented the University of California, Davis as a member of the Far Western Conference (FWC) during the 1962 NCAA College Division football season. Led by seventh-year head coach Will Lotter, the Aggies compiled an overall record of 5–4 with a mark of 2–3 in conference play, placing in a three-way tie for fourth in the FWC. The team outscored its opponents 131 to 110 for the season. The Aggies played home games at Toomey Field in Davis, California.

The UC Davis sports teams were commonly called the "Cal Aggies" from 1924 until the mid 1970s.

Schedule

Notes

References

UC Davis
UC Davis Aggies football seasons
UC Davis Aggies football